The discography of Sam Bailey, an English singer, songwriter and musicals actress, consists of two studio albums and six singles. She won the tenth series of The X Factor in 2013. Following her win, her debut single, a cover of Demi Lovato's "Skyscraper" was released on 15 December 2013, achieving the Christmas number one on 22 December 2013. She released her debut studio album, The Power of Love, on 24 March 2014. On 30 March, the album debuted at number one on the UK Albums Chart, making Bailey the first X Factor winner to have a number-one album since Alexandra Burke topped the chart with her debut album Overcome in October 2009. The album sold 72,644 copies in its first week, making it the fastest-selling album of 2014 in the UK at the time, overtaking Pharrell Williams' Girl. The album was re-packaged and re-released on 1 December 2014. The re-issue featured five new tracks - including three Christmas tunes and a reworking of original song "Treasure". As well as the festive songs ("Silent Night", "Please Come Home for Christmas" and "O Holy Night"), the album also included "With You" from Ghost the Musical. On 16 September 2016, she released her second studio album, Sing My Heart Out. The album peaked at number 33 on the UK Albums Chart. The album includes the single "Sing My Heart Out".

Albums

Singles

Other charted songs

Soundtracks

Other appearances

Music videos

References

Notes

Sources

Discographies of British artists